Nadège Bobillier (born 22 January 1988 in Annecy, Haute-Savoie) is a French former competitive figure skater. She is the 2005 and 2006 French national champion. She competed at the 2006 World Figure Skating Championships and the 2006 European Figure Skating Championships.

Competitive highlights
GP: Grand Prix

Programs

References

External links
 
  

1988 births
Living people
Sportspeople from Annecy
French female single skaters